Colin Cotterill (born 2 October 1952) is a London-born teacher, author, comic book writer and cartoonist. Cotterill has dual English and Australian citizenship. He lives in Thailand, where he writes the award-winning Dr. Siri Paiboun mystery series set in the Lao People's Democratic Republic, and the Jimm Juree crime novels set in southern Thailand.

Biography
Colin Cotterill was born in London and trained as a teacher. He worked as a physical education instructor in Israel, a primary school teacher in Australia, a counsellor for educationally handicapped adults in the U.S. and a university lecturer in Japan. More recently he taught and trained teachers in Thailand, and on the Burmese border. He spent several years in Laos, initially with UNESCO, and wrote and produced a forty-programme language teaching series; English By Accident, for Thai national television.

Cotterill became involved in child protection in the region and set up an NGO in Phuket, which he ran for the first two years. After two more years of study of child abuse issues, and one more stint in Phuket, he moved on to ECPAT, an international organisation combating child prostitution and pornography. He established their training programme for caregivers. During this time Cotterill contributed regular columns to the Bangkok Post.

Cotterill's first novel, The Night Bastard, was published by Suk's Editions in 2000. The positive reaction to this novel prompted Cotterill to write full-time. His subsequent books include Evil in the Land Without (Asia Books 2003), Pool and Its Role in Asian Communism (Asia Books 2005), The Coroner's Lunch (Soho Press 2004), Thirty Three Teeth (2005), Disco for the Departed (2006), Anarchy and Old Dogs (2007), Curse of the Pogo Stick (2008), The Merry Misogynist (2009), Love Songs from a Shallow Grave (2010), and Slash and Burn (2011).

On 15 June 2009 Colin Cotterill received the Crime Writers' Association "Dagger in the Library" award for being "the author of crime fiction whose work is currently giving the greatest enjoyment to library users".

Cotterill set up the Books for Laos project to send books to Lao children and sponsor trainee teachers. Books for Laos receives support from fans of the books and is administered purely on a voluntary basis. He has also been involved in Big Brother Mouse, a not-for-profit publishing project in Laos founded by Sasha Alyson.

Since 1990 Cotterill has been a regular cartoonist for national publications. A Thai-language translation of his cartoon scrapbook Ethel and Joan Go to Phuket was published by Matichon in 2004. On 4 April 2004 he launched an illustrated bilingual column, Cycle Logical, in the news magazine Matichon Weekly. Some of these columns have since been collected in a book.

Awards
2010 Finalist, Dilys Award for "Love Songs from a Shallow Grave"
2009 CWA "Dagger in The Library" award for The Dr. Siri Series
2009 Short-listed for Crimefest "Last Laugh Award" for Anarchy and Old Dogs
2008 Short-listed for "CWA Dagger" for The Coroner's Lunch
2007 Prix SNCF Du Polar for Le Dejeuner du Coroner (The Coroner's Lunch)
2006 Dilys Award for Thirty Three Teeth
2005 Nominee for Barry Award "Best First Novel" for The Coroner's Lunch

Bibliography

Dr Siri Paiboun series
The Coroner's Lunch (2004) - Soho Press, New York. 
Thirty-Three Teeth (August 2005) - Soho Press, New York. 
Disco for the Departed (August 2006) - Soho Press, New York. 
Anarchy and Old Dogs (August 2007) - Soho Press, New York. 
Curse of the Pogo Stick (August 2008) - Soho Press, New York, 
The Merry Misogynist (August 2009) - 
Soho Press, New York. , 
Quercus, UK. 
Love Songs from a Shallow Grave (August 2010) - Soho Press, New York. 
Slash and Burn (October 2011) - Quercus Publishing Plc, London. 
The Woman Who Wouldn't Die (January 2013) - Quercus Publishing Plc, London. 
Six and a Half Deadly Sins (June 2015) - Soho Crime, New York. 
I Shot the Buddha (August 2016) - Soho Crime, New York. 
The Rat Catchers' Olympics (August 2017) - Soho Crime, New York. 
Don't Eat Me (August 2018) - Soho Crime, New York. 
The Second Biggest Nothing (2019) 
The Delightful Life of a Suicide Pilot (2020)

Jimm Juree series
Killed at the Whim of a Hat (July 2011) - Minotaur Books, New York 
Grandad, There's a Head on the Beach (June 2012) - Minotaur Books, New York 
The Axe Factor (April 2014) - Minotaur Books, New York 
The Amok Runners (June 2016) - CreateSpace Independent Publishing Platform

Other publications
Bleeding in Black and White (April 2015) - CreateSpace Independent Publishing Platform 
Ageing Disgracefully (October 2009) - iUniverse, USA
Cyclelogical
Weekly column - Matichon Suth Supdah Magazine. Thailand.
Cyclelogical collection in book form (2006) (ขับช้าชิดซ้าย) - Matichon, Bangkok, 
Pool and its Role in Asian Communism (2005) - CreateSpace Independent Publishing Platform, 
Ethel and Joan Go to Phuket (2004) (ภูเก็ตพังแน่ แม่แม่กำลังมา) - Matichon Publishing House (Thai language), Thailand 
Evil in the Land Without (2003) - CreateSpace Independent Publishing Platform 
The Night Bastard (2000) - Suk's Editions, Thailand

References

External links

Author's homepage at Random House
Books For Laos Project
Author's homepage at Macmillan

British mystery writers
British cartoonists
21st-century British novelists
21st-century Australian novelists
Australian male novelists
Australian crime writers
Australian crime fiction writers
Australian mystery writers
Australian cartoonists
1952 births
Living people
Dilys Award winners
British male writers
21st-century Australian male writers